Mahanadi Institute of Medical Science and Research is a tertiary Government medical college in Talcher, Odisha, East India, and is accredited by the Medical Council of India. The college awards the degree Bachelor of Medicine and Bachelor of Surgery (MBBS).  The college was established by Coal India limited.

History
Mahanadi Coalfields Limited (MCL), the public sector undertaking and subsidiary of Coal India Limited reiterated its commitment to set up a medical college and hospital in the state, and signed a MoU with National Building Corporation of India (NBCC) for medical college.

On 2022 Government of Odisha agrees to run the Medical college, while MCL will provide funds for operation.

Courses offered
The college offers the degree Bachelor of Medicine and Bachelor of Surgery (MBBS). Selection to the college is done on the basis of merit through the National Eligibility and Entrance Test. Yearly undergraduate student intake is 100 and the college has 500 beds.

References

Medical colleges in Odisha
Universities and colleges in Odisha
Educational institutions established in 2020
2020 establishments in Odisha